Gili Genteng (also called Pulau Genteng or Pulau Gili Genting) is an island located in the southeast Madura Island. Administratively, this island included in the Gili Genting District, Sumenep, East Java. Gili Genting District consists of two islands, namely Gili Raja Island, which is located on the west of Gili Genting Island, and Gili Genting Island as the center of the sub-district. Almost all the inhabitants of this island are Madurese people and most of the people migrated to Cirebon, Jakarta, Serang, and Banten. They mostly opened basic food stores. In Cirebon alone, nearly 500 shops were owned by people from Gili Genting, and had once established the IKAMA Organization (Ikatan Keluarga Madura - Madura Family Association) which aims to discipline the Gili Genting people in Cirebon. Gili Genting District was officially formed in 1982, based on GOVERNMENT REGULATION OF THE REPUBLIC OF INDONESIA (PP) NUMBER 7 OF 1982 (7/1982). Gili Genting District consists of 8 villages namely: Aenganyar Village, Gedugan Village, Bringsang Village, Galis Village (in Gili Genting Island) and Banbaru Village, Ban Maleng Village, Lombang Village, Jate Village (in Gili Raja Island).

External links 

 East Java Government website
 Sumenep Regency Government website

Islands of Indonesia